Amity in Fame is an Acoustic Rock band from Linz, Austria. Precisely, the band plays Powerful Acoustic Rock, a style that is obviously self-titled by the band.

History

First year

The band formed in May 2008 and quickly recorded a debut album. In July 2008, Amity in Fame released their debut album Dinner for One which was self-recorded, self-mastered and also produced and released by the band at a very low budget. The album became one of the most downloaded albums ever on Jamendo with over 20,000 downloads worldwide. In January 2009, the band released their first low budget music video, Dinner for One which received around 80,000 views on YouTube in the first two years and also got regular airplay on one of Middle Europe's biggest music channels, Go TV. Less than a year after the band's first rehearsal, they had already appeared on numerous European radio stations, music blogs and compilation albums. The band also achieved rank five in Middle-Europe's biggest band contest, the International Live Award, which is contested with over 1000 bands. The debut album "Dinner for One" is one of the most successful CC-albums to date and it was also picked by Rammstein to be aired regularly via the PA before the band's concerts.

2010-early 2011

The band concentrated on further developing the style of Powerful Acoustic Rock and reaching a new level in composition and artistic conception. The second studio album, Through, was written and recorded. It was released on May 6, 2011. According to the band, the new album represents a new level of powerful acoustic rock. With this album, Amity in Fame wants to lure its listeners into a new world of unique sound and pitoresque fantasies. Critics agree that with the second album, the band managed to broaden its stylistic spectrum  and even step out of its self-titled genre.

Style
The band play heavy, powerful acoustic rock with progressive elements. The band members are mainly influenced by metal but refuse to use distorted guitars in their songs. Unlike most progressive rock bands, the hard and driving parts of the songs go with undistorted guitars and a dominant bass and drums.

While the band uses the term "powerful acoustic rock" to describe its music, reviewers linked them with art rock and progressive rock but also Heavy Rock and Power Metal or even Grunge. Generally, most reviewers agree that the band doesn't perfectly fit into a specific genre. This also applies to the Acoustic Rock genre as the band has an acoustic sound but doesn't play by the acoustic rule-book.

Members
Filip Hörschläger - Guitar
Michael Bichler - Vocals
Roman Mayrhofer - Bass
Markus Dörfler - Drums
Nadine Fambach - Vocals
Alex Zaus - Piano/Keys

ex-members:
Judith Scheweder - Vocals
Wilfried Wöss - Drums

Discography
2008 - Dinner For One
2009 - Gasometer (Live EP)
2011 - Through

Reference list

External links
 Official Band homepage including biography
 Band's Myspace page (including blogs) at MySpace
 Graviton Music Services at MySpace
 Band's Jamendo page at Jamendo

Austrian progressive rock groups